Timo Salminen (11 July 1952 in Helsinki) is a Finnish cinematographer best known for his artistic work in Aki Kaurismäki's films. Salminen's father Ville Salminen was a famed Finnish film actor, director, writer and producer whose career began in the 1930s and lasted until the 1980s. His older step brother Ville-Veikko Salminen was a comedic actor whose career also lasted over 50 years.

For his work in Kaurismäki's films, Salminen has been awarded five Jussi Awards for Best Cinematography while being nominated for three more. He was also twice nominated for the Best Cinematographer award at the European Film Awards.

Partial filmography
 The Other Side of Hope (2017)
 Jauja (2014)
 Le Havre (2011)
 Lights in the Dusk (2006)
 Pelicanman (2004)
 The Man Without a Past (2002)
 The Classic (2001)
 Juha (1999)
 Drifting Clouds (1996)
 Leningrad Cowboys Meet Moses (1994)
 Take Care of Your Scarf, Tatiana (1994)
 The Last Border (1993)
 La Vie de Bohème (1992)
 I Hired a Contract Killer (1990)
 The Match Factory Girl (1990)
 Leningrad Cowboys Go America (1989)
 Ariel (1988)
 Hamlet Goes Business (1987)
 Shadows in Paradise (1986)
 Calamari Union (1985)
 Crime and Punishment (1983)
 The Worthless (1982)

References

External links
 

Finnish cinematographers
Living people
1952 births